Ole Giæver (born 19 July 1977, in Tromsø), is a Norwegian film director, screenwriter and actor. He was educated at the Nordland Art and Film College in Lofoten and Konstfack in Stockholm. His debut feature film was The Mountain, released 2011. His second feature was Out of Nature in which he also played the leading role, for which he was awarded The Kanon Award for Best Actor in 2015. His third feature From the Balcony is set to be released in 2017.

Filmography
 Kjærlighetsunivers her hvor de møtes (2002) – short film
 The Pledge (2003) – short film
 Tiden er min venn (2003) – short film
 Forspill (2004) – short film
 Testen (2005) – short film
 Blokk B (2006) – short film
 I Tommy (2007) – short film
 Sommerhuset (2008) – featurette
 The Mountain (Fjellet) (2011)
 Out of Nature (Mot naturen) (2014)
 From the Balcony (Fra balkongen) (2017)

External links

References

1977 births
21st-century Norwegian male actors
Living people
Norwegian male actors
Norwegian film directors
Norwegian male film actors
Norwegian screenwriters
People from Tromsø